Christopher Greenbury (September 24, 1951 – January 4, 2007) was an English film editor with more than thirty film credits dating from 1979's The Muppet Movie. With Tariq Anwar, he won the BAFTA Award for Best Editing for American Beauty (1999), which he was also nominated for an Academy Award for Best Film Editing. American Beauty is a serious drama, but in general Greenbury edited comedy films, including six directed by the Farrelly brothers commencing with 1994's Dumb and Dumber.

Greenbury was a member of the American Cinema Editors (ACE).

Filmography

Based on Greenbury's filmography at the Internet Database. The director and release date of each film are indicated in parenthesis.

The Sex Thief (Campbell – 1973)
The Day of the Locust (Schlesinger – 1975)
The Adventure of Sherlock Holmes' Smarter Brother (Wilder – 1975)
The World's Greatest Lover (Wilder – 1977)
Survival Run (Spiegel – 1979)
The Muppet Movie (Frawley – 1979)
On the Air Live with Captain Midnight (Sebastian – 1979)
Where the Buffalo Roam (Linson – 1980)
Chu Chu and the Philly Flash (Rich – 1981)
Liar's Moon (Fisher – 1982)
Some Kind of Hero (Pressman – 1982)
Doctor Detroit (Pressman – 1983)
Smokey and the Bandit Part 3 (Lowry – 1983)
The Woman in Red (Wilder – 1984)
The Heavenly Kid (Medoway – 1985)
Haunted Honeymoon (Wilder – 1986)
Three for the Road (Norton – 1987)
Options (Vila – 1989)
The Naked Gun 2½: The Smell of Fear (Zucker – 1991)
Live Wire (Duguay – 1992)
Loaded Weapon 1 (Quintano – 1993)
Frank and Jesse (Boris – 1994)
Dumb and Dumber (Farrelly – 1994)
The Baby-Sitters Club (Mayron – 1995)
Bio-Dome (Bloom – 1996)
Kingpin (Farrelly – 1996)
Booty Call (Pollack – 1997)
There's Something About Mary (Farrelly – 1998)
Lost & Found (Pollack – 1999)
American Beauty (Mendes – 1999)
Me, Myself & Irene (Farrelly – 2000)
Say It Isn't So (Rogers – 2001)
Serendipity (Chelsom – 2001)
Shallow Hal (Farrelly – 2001)
View from the Top (Barreto – 2003)
Daddy Day Care (Carr – 2003)
Stuck on You (Farrelly – 2003)
The Pacifier (Shankman – 2005)
Cheaper by the Dozen 2 (Shankman – 2005)
Gettin' It (Gaitatjis – 2006)
Wild Hogs (Becker – 2007)

Editing award nominations for American Beauty
In addition to winning the BAFTA, the editors of American Beauty were also nominated for the Academy Award for Film Editing, an ACE Eddie Award, the Las Vegas Film Critics Society Award, the Online Film Critics Society Award and the Satellite Award.

References

Further reading
 Greenbury and Anwar reflect on the editing of American Beauty, for which they had been nominated for the Academy Award. Greenbury was the original editor of the film, but left it for another commitment; Anwar then finished the editing.

1951 births
2007 deaths
Best Editing BAFTA Award winners
American Cinema Editors
British film editors
Place of birth missing
Place of death missing